Barry Brust (born August 8, 1983) is a Canadian professional ice hockey goaltender who was last under contract with UK Elite Ice Hockey League (EIHL) side Sheffield Steelers. Brust has played in National Hockey League (NHL) for the Los Angeles Kings.

Playing career
Brust was drafted in the third round, 73rd overall in the 2002 NHL Entry Draft by the Minnesota Wild from the Spokane Chiefs of the Western Hockey League. After his final year in the WHL with the Calgary Hitmen, Brust signed as a free agent with the Los Angeles Kings to a three-year contract on June 9, 2004.

After initially beginning his professional career with the Kings ECHL affiliate of the Reading Royals, Brust moved up to the AHL with the Manchester Monarchs before making his NHL debut with the Kings in the 2006–07 season and played in 11 games, winning two.

After not being offered a qualifying offer by the Kings before the 2007–08 season, he signed with the Houston Aeros of the American Hockey League, the primary affiliate of his original draft team in the Minnesota Wild. Brust was awarded at season's end, along with Aero's teammate Nolan Schaefer, the Harry "Hap" Holmes Memorial Award for the fewest goals against in the AHL. On July 1, 2008, Brust was signed to a new two-year deal with the Wild and was assigned back to the Aeros.

After beginning the 2009–10 season with a persistent foot injury from the previous injury affected season, Brust was reassigned from the Aeros to the Florida Everblades of the ECHL on a rehab assignment on November 10, 2009.

On July 21, 2010, Brust left the Aeros organization after three years and signed as a free agent to a one-year contract with the Binghamton Senators of the AHL. After one season with the Senators, during which the team won the Calder Cup, Brust signed a one-year contract with Straubing in July 2011.

After a solid season abroad in the German DEL, Brust returned to North America to sign a one-year AHL contract with the Abbotsford Heat on August 8, 2012.

On November 24, 2012, Brust set a new AHL record for longest shutout streak at 268 minutes and 17 seconds, breaking Hockey Hall of Famer Johnny Bower's previous record set with the Cleveland Barons in 1957.

On July 8, 2013, Brust signed as a free agent to a one-year contract with KHL Medveščak Zagreb of the Kontinental Hockey League (KHL).

On July 21, 2017, Brust was signed to a one-year deal by HC Fribourg-Gottéron of the National League (NL) as an emergency plan to replace Reto Berra who went back to the NHL without playing a single minute for Fribourg. In the 2017–18 season, Brust claimed the starting duties with Fribourg, making 38 appearances in posting a 2.29 goals against average with a .926 save percentage.

At the conclusion of his contract in Switzerland, Brust returned to the KHL, agreeing to terms with Chinese participant, Kunlun Red Star on October 12, 2018. After making just 9 appearances to start the 2018–19 season, Brust transferred from Kunlun to Torpedo Nizhny Novgorod on December 26, 2018.

Brust spent the 2019–20 season playing with HC Slovan Bratislava of the Slovak Extraliga (Slovak), before sitting out the 2020–21 campaign. In August 2021, Brust was announced as having signed with UK Elite Ice Hockey League (EIHL) side Sheffield Steelers.

In August 2022, it was announced Brust would not be returning to Sheffield for the 2022–23 season.

Career statistics

Awards and honours

References

External links

1983 births
Living people
Abbotsford Heat players
Binghamton Senators players
Calgary Hitmen players
Canadian ice hockey goaltenders
Florida Everblades players
HC Fribourg-Gottéron players
Houston Aeros (1994–2013) players
Ice hockey people from Manitoba
KHL Medveščak Zagreb players
HC Kunlun Red Star players
Los Angeles Kings players
Manchester Monarchs (AHL) players
Minnesota Wild draft picks
Reading Royals players
Sheffield Steelers players
HC Slovan Bratislava players
Spokane Chiefs players
Straubing Tigers players
Swan Valley Stampeders players
Torpedo Nizhny Novgorod players
HC Yugra players
Canadian expatriate ice hockey players in Slovakia
Canadian expatriate ice hockey players in Croatia
Canadian expatriate ice hockey players in Germany
Canadian expatriate ice hockey players in Russia
Canadian expatriate ice hockey players in the United States
Canadian expatriate ice hockey players in England
Canadian expatriate ice hockey players in China
Canadian expatriate ice hockey players in Switzerland